Sampoorna Teerth Yatra is a 1970 Bollywood fantasy film directed by Dhirubhai Desai. The film stars Jaymala and Jeevan.

Cast
Jaymala ...  Bimla 
Jeevan ...  Bhagwan Naradmuni 
Mahipal ...  Uttam

Songs
"Daya Karo Hum Pe Bhole Shankar" - Mahendra Kapoor
"Ganga Maiya Aaj Humari Rakh Le Laaj" -  Hemlata
"Hum Hai Bramha Vishnu Mahesh" - Shivram, Mahendra Kapoor
"Hum Hai Tumhare Tum Humare" - Mahendra Kapoor, Hemlata

External links
 

1970 films
1970s Hindi-language films
Indian fantasy films
Pilgrimage in India
1970s fantasy films
Films directed by Dhirubhai Desai